The Party of Regions of Moldova (PRM)  is a political party in Moldova. It  was founded on September 23, 2011, and registered on October 18, 2011. In 2018 it had about 1,200 members.

During 2011-2016 it was headed by Mihail Formuzal. Since 2016 the leader is lawyer Alexandr Kalinin (born 1977). Since 2000 he has been representing the Moldovan diaspora in Russian Federation.

Electoral results

2014 Moldovan parliamentary election, part of the bloc  "Alegerea Moldovei – Uniunea Vamală" / "Moldova's Choice - Customs Union", whose performance was: votes 55,089	%%: 3.45, seats: 0
2015 local general elections: 6 mandates of councilor in city and village councils (0.06%)
2020 Moldovan presidential election: Kalinin withdrew.
2021 Moldovan parliamentary election: votes: 1,264, %%: 0.09, seats: 0

References

External links

2011 establishments in Moldova
Eurosceptic parties in Moldova
Political parties established in 2011
Political parties in Moldova
Populist parties
Russian political parties in Moldova